Luitzen "Lou" Dijkstra (7 May 1909 – 24 April 1964) was a Dutch speed skater who competed in the 1936 Winter Olympics.

He was born in Paesens, Friesland.

In 1936 he finished 16th in the 5000 metres event, 20th in the 1500 metres competition, as well as 20th in the 10000 metres event, and 24th in the 500 metres competition.

Dijkstra was the father of Sjoukje Dijkstra, a figure skater who won a gold medal in the 1964 Winter Olympics.

External links
 Speed skating 1936 

1909 births
1964 deaths
Dutch male speed skaters
Olympic speed skaters of the Netherlands
Speed skaters at the 1936 Winter Olympics
People from Dongeradeel
Sportspeople from Friesland